Asclepias variegata, commonly called the redring milkweed or white milkweed, is a plant in the family Apocynaceae. It is native to eastern North America, where it is found in Canada and the United States. It is most common in the Southeastern United States, and becomes rare in the northern edge of its range.

Its natural habitat is forest openings and savannas, often in sandy soils.

It produces small white flowers with purplish centers that area crowded into round, terminal clusters. It flowers in early summer.

Conservation status in the United States
It is endangered in the states of New York, and Pennsylvania. It is listed as a special concern species and believed extirpated in Connecticut.

References

variegata